Francis Gregory Alan Morris (September 27, 1933 – August 27, 1996) was an American actor. He was best known for portraying Barney Collier on Mission: Impossible and Lt. David Nelson on Vega$.

Early life and career 
Born in Cleveland, Ohio, to jazz trumpeter Francis Williams, Morris served in the United States Army during the Korean War.
While in college at Iowa on the G.I. Bill, Morris was active in college theater and hosted the late afternoon Jazz radio show, "Tea-Time", on the University of Iowa station, WSUI. He co-produced concerts at the university with a student friend.
Morris began his television acting career in the 1960s, making guest appearances on numerous TV shows such as Alfred Hitchcock Hour, The Twilight Zone, Branded and Ben Casey. In 1966, Morris was cast in his most recognizable role as the team electronics expert Barney Collier in the TV series Mission: Impossible.  Morris and Bob Johnson were the only actors to remain with Mission Impossible throughout its entire run.
After Iowa, Greg's first professional stage role was in The Death of Bessie Smith. One of his earliest television roles was a cameo appearance on The Dick Van Dyke Show in the episode "That's My Boy?", where Rob becomes convinced that they have taken home the wrong baby from the hospital. The revelation of Morris' character as the other child's father prompted a record setting bout of laughter from the studio audience. He also appeared in the 1963–64 season of ABC's drama about college life, Channing, starring Jason Evers and Henry Jones.

After Mission: Impossible was cancelled, Morris appeared in several movies and made guest TV appearances, including The Six Million Dollar Man (Episode 1-05, "Little Orphan Airplane", 1974). Morris was then cast as Lt. David Nelson of the Las Vegas Metro Police in the ABC TV detective series Vega$ (1978–1981), co-starring Robert Urich, Bart Braverman, and Phyllis Davis. On March 3, 1981, by which point most filming for the season had concluded, Morris was involved in a serious car accident on I-15 near Las Vegas.

After the cancellation of Vega$, Morris continued to make guest TV appearances, including several episodes in the short-lived 1988–1990 remake of the Mission: Impossible TV series, starring his son Phil Morris. Phil Morris was cast as Grant Collier, the son of Barney. Morris also appeared in two episodes of the TV series What's Happening!! as Lawrence Nelson (father of Dwayne) and in three episodes of The Jeffersons, in which he reprised his role as an electronics expert (although not as Barney Collier) in a comparison sequel of the Mission: Impossible series. Morris was also a frequent guest star on Password, Tattletales, and Password Plus in the 1960s and 1970s.

Shortly before his death in 1996, Morris saw the film version of Mission: Impossible starring Tom Cruise. He so disliked the movie (as did some of his former co-stars) that he left the theater early, calling it "an abomination".

Personal life 
Morris married his wife Leona Keyes in 1956, and remained married until his death. Together they had three children, including actor Phil Morris and actress Iona Morris. Leona Morris died on November 2, 2016, aged 81.

Death 
Morris died on August 27, 1996 of lung cancer and a brain tumor in Las Vegas, Nevada at the age of 62.

Filmography

References

External links
 
 
 Greg Morris at TV.com 
 'Mission: Impossible' actor dies

1933 births
1996 deaths
African-American male actors
American male television actors
Deaths from brain cancer in the United States
American male film actors
Male actors from Cleveland
University of Iowa alumni
Deaths from cancer in Nevada
20th-century American male actors
20th-century African-American people